The 2019 season is Geylang International's 24th consecutive season in the top flight of Singapore football and in the Singapore Premier League. Along with the Singapore Premier League, the club will also compete in the Singapore Cup.

Key events

Pre-season

 On 26/9/2018, it was reported that Geylang International is interested in bringing Song Ui-young to Bedok Stadium together with their former coach, Lee Lim Saeng for Season 2019.  Joining the Eagles to express interest is Indonesian giants Persija Jakarta.
 On 30/10/2018, the team announced their 1st signing of the 2019 season.  Shahrin Saberin officially joined from Home United after his contract ended.
 On 31/10/2018, the team announced that Zainol Gulam is the 1st player to sign an extension to their contract.

In-season
 On 24/4/2019, Syahiran Miswan was banned for 3 matches for committing an act of violent conduct on opponent at the 64th minute of play against Warriors FC.

Squad

Sleague

U19

Coaching staff

Transfers

Pre-season transfers

In

Out

Retained

Extension

Promoted

Trial

Mid-season transfer

In

Out

Friendlies

Pre-season friendlies

Tour of Malaysia (20 to 27 January)

Mid-season friendlies

Team statistics

Appearances and goals

Note 1: Darren Teh scored an own goal against Balestier Khalsa on 31/3/2019.

Competitions

Overview

Singapore Premier League

Singapore Cup

Semi-final

Tampines Rovers won 4-1 on aggregate.

3rd/4th place

See also 
 2012 Geylang International FC season
 2013 Geylang International FC season
 2014 Geylang International FC season
 2015 Geylang International FC season
 2016 Geylang International FC season
 2017 Geylang International FC season
 2018 Geylang International FC season

References 

Geylang International FC
Geylang International FC seasons